Gotham (also Richland City) is a census-designated place, in the town of Buena Vista, in Richland County, Wisconsin, United States. It is located at the intersection of Wisconsin Highway 60 and U.S. Route 14. It is just north of the Wisconsin River, northeast of Avoca and southeast of Richland Center. As of the 2020 census, its population was 189.



History
The name Gotham came from Captain Myron Wheeler Gotham (1842-1902), who once resided in the village.  Gotham died with his sons, Lucius and Myron, during a violent storm in the Great Lakes in 1902.

Demographics

See also
 List of census-designated places in Wisconsin

References

External links

Map of Gotham, Wisconsin
"Tales The Tombstone Tell Columns" Republican Observer, 1956

Census-designated places in Wisconsin
Census-designated places in Richland County, Wisconsin